Clairefontaine-en-Yvelines is a commune in the Yvelines department in the Île-de-France region in north-central France.

It is the base of the Clairefontaine French National football academy.

See also
Communes of the Yvelines department
 Listing of the works of Alexandre Falguière

References

Communes of Yvelines